Kuřimská Nová Ves is a municipality and village in Brno-Country District in the South Moravian Region of the Czech Republic. It has about 100 inhabitants.

Administrative parts
The village of Prosatín is an administrative part of Kuřimská Nová Ves.

References

Villages in Brno-Country District